Esteban Fernando Sachetti (born 21 November 1985) is an Argentine footballer who plays as a defensive midfielder for Alki Oroklini.

Career statistics

External links

BDFA profile 

1985 births
Living people
Argentine footballers
Argentine expatriate footballers
Association football midfielders
Tercera División players
Sevilla FC C players
CD San Fernando players
Cypriot First Division players
Cypriot Second Division players
Doxa Katokopias FC players
AEL Limassol players
Apollon Limassol FC players
Alki Oroklini players
Argentine expatriate sportspeople in Spain
Argentine expatriate sportspeople in Cyprus
Expatriate footballers in Spain
Expatriate footballers in Cyprus
Sportspeople from Tucumán Province